State Route 51 (SR 51) is a northwest-southeast highway (signed north-south) in northwest Ohio.  Its southern terminus is at U.S. Route 20 just south of Elmore, Ohio, and its northern terminus is at its interchange, along with State Route 184, at U.S. Route 23 in Sylvania, Ohio. Before an ODOT signage project in 2010, the northern (western) portion of the route, from its northern (western) terminus to the Maumee River was signed as an east-west route.  The portion from the Maumee to its southern (eastern) terminus was signed north-south.  ODOT has now signed all portions as north-south.

Route description
From its southern terminus, State Route 51 heads north to an interchange with the Ohio Turnpike before it enters Elmore.  After exiting Elmore, the route heads northwest through the village of Genoa and near the town of Millbury before entering Northwood.  The route from here to the Maumee River is also known as Woodville Road.

The route interchanges with Interstate 280 before entering southwest Oregon and into Toledo.  After it crosses the Maumee, it eventually moves onto Monroe Street, which moves in a generally northwesterly direction until it reaches U.S. Route 23 in Sylvania, where it ends.  SR 184 and US 223 end here as well.

History
The original route of State Route 51 was that of current State Route 49 in western Ohio.  The route was generally changed from 51 to 49 until the entire route became 49 in 1935.

A new State Route 51 was certified in 1955, with its southern terminus where it is now and its northern terminus at then-State Route 120 (close to where I-280 is now) in Northwood.  State Route 51 was extended to State Route 2 in Oregon in 1959.

In 1989, State Route 51 replaced the route of U.S. Route 223 though Toledo and Sylvania across the Maumee River and on Monroe Street.  U.S. Route 223 now officially ends at U.S. Route 23's interchange with State Routes 51 and 184 in Sylvania.

State Route 51's interchange with the Ohio Turnpike was opened in 1997.

Major junctions

References

051
Transportation in Lucas County, Ohio
Transportation in Wood County, Ohio
Transportation in Ottawa County, Ohio
Transportation in Sandusky County, Ohio